Rohan Gunaratna (born 1961) is a Sri Lankan born political analyst specializing in international terrorism. He is the Director General of the Institute of National Security Studies. Professor Gunaratna has over 30 years of academic, policy, and operational experience in national and international security. He is Honorary Professor at the General Sir John Kotelawala Defence University (KDU) and is a Senior Advisor to its Faculty of Defence and Strategic Studies. He supervised KDU’s first Ph.D. title holder, Admiral Prof. Jayanath Colombage, the current Foreign Secretary of Sri Lanka. 

In the 1980s and 1990s, Gunaratna served as Special Assistant to the Science Advisor to the President Prof. Cyril Ponnamperuma, Research Assistant to President J.R. Jayewardene, and consultant to the HQ of the Joint Operations Command and the Ministry of Defence. In 2009, he co-designed the 6+1 model for rehabilitating 11,500 LTTE members. In 2015, the Ministry of Defence invited him to write the blue print for a think tank that he named the Institute of National Security Studies.

Education
Educated at Ananda College, Gunaratna received his Masters from the University of Notre Dame where he was Hesburgh Scholar and doctorate from the University of St Andrews where he was British Chevening Scholar.

Career
In 2013, Sri Lankan member of parliament Wijeyadasa Rajapakshe wrote in op-ed in which said that "he (Gunaratna) insisted the importance of combating terrorism, he did not address on the cause for the emergence of terrorism." In 2017, Inspector General of Bangladesh Police dismissed his claims of ISIS presence in Bangladesh by saying that he had no experience in "real issues."

Hambali claims 
In 2003, Gunaratna claimed that Al-Qaeda commander Riduan Isamuddin (alias Hambali) regularly visited Australia and plotted to fly planes into the British Houses of Parliament; these claims were dismissed as baseless by the ASIO. Commenting on one of his books, the Pacific Journalism Review said in its review that "his writing here on Indonesia reveals a remarkably narrow selection of sources, a profound lack of knowledge, and a flawed understanding of the history of the Indonesian armed forces and of their intelligence operates".  Australian journalist and commentator on intelligence issues Brian Toohey has called him a "self-proclaimed expert". He has also made false claims to be a "principal investigator" at the UN's Terrorism Prevention Branch. In reality, he has only spoken at a seminar organized by the Australian Parliamentary Library, testified at a Congressional hearing on terrorism and delivered a research paper at a conference organized by the UN's Department for Disarmament Affairs.

In 2004, New Zealand journalist Martin Bright described Gunaratna as “the least reliable of the experts on bin Laden”. His claims to the New Zealand Herald that "sympathisers and supporters of various terrorist groups were in New Zealand” and to have seen their fundraising leaflets were also dismissed by New Zealand's Financial Intelligence Unit.

Claim against Canadian Tamil Congress 
In a February 2011 article in Lakbima News, Gunaratna claimed that the Canadian Tamil Congress (CTC) was a front for the Liberation Tigers of Tamil Eelam. The CTC sued Gunaratna, and on 21 January 2014, the Ontario Superior Court of Justice ruled against Gunaratna, ordering home to pay the CTC damages of $37,000, and costs of $16,000. In his ruling judge Stephen E. Firestone stated that Gunaratna's claims were unequivocally and incontrovertibly "false and untrue".

Bibliography

References

External links
Staff Profile of Rohan Gunaratna, S. Rajaratnam School of International Studies, A Graduate School of Nanyang Technological University, Singapore
International Centre for Political Violence and Terrorism Research
Bradley Hope, How Commissioner Kelly Reads His Way To Vigilance on Crime, New York Sun October 2006.
Daniel Hoare, Gareth Evans downplays terrorist risk in Australia

Living people
Alumni of the University of St Andrews
Terrorism in Singapore
Experts on terrorism
Singaporean Buddhists
Singaporean people of Sri Lankan descent
1961 births